And So I Watch You From Afar is the self-titled, first studio album from the Northern Irish instrumental band And So I Watch You From Afar, released in April 2009. It was re-released in 2013 as a special edition and included four tracks from the Letters EP .

Track listing

Personnel
Rory Friers – guitar
Tony Wright – guitar
Jonathan Adger – bass guitar
Chris Wee – drums, percussion

References

2009 albums
And So I Watch You from Afar albums